The 1902 Boston Americans season was the second season for the professional baseball franchise that later became known as the Boston Red Sox. The Americans finished third in the American League (AL) with a record of 77 wins and 60 losses,  games behind the Philadelphia Athletics. The team was managed by Jimmy Collins and played its home games at Huntington Avenue Grounds.

Regular season 
Prior to the regular season, the team held spring training in Augusta, Georgia.
 April 19: The season opens with a 7–6 home win over the Baltimore Orioles.
 June 28: A forfeit is declared in Boston's favor during a road game against the Orioles. With Boston leading, 9–4 in the eighth inning, umpire Tom Connolly called a Baltimore runner out for missing second base. The call was argued by Baltimore manager John McGraw, resulting in his ejection. After McGraw refused to leave the field, Connolly forfeited the game to Boston.
 July 8: In their highest-scoring game of the year, Boston loses at home to the Philadelphia Athletics, 22–9.
 July 9: The team's longest game of the season ends as a 4–2 loss in 15 innings to the visiting Athletics.
 July 19: The team's longest losing streak of the season, six games between July 12 and 18, comes to an end with a victory over the visiting Chicago White Stockings.
 July 29: The team's longest winning streak of the season, eight games between July 19 and 28, comes to an end with a loss to the visiting Detroit Tigers.
 September 29: The season ends with a 9–5 road win over the Orioles. This was the last game the Orioles played at Oriole Park in Baltimore; in 1903, they relocated to New York City as the Highlanders, then in 1913 became known as the New York Yankees.

Statistical leaders
The offense was led by Buck Freeman, who hit 11 home runs and had 121 RBIs, and Patsy Dougherty with a .342 batting average. The pitching staff was led by Cy Young, who made 45 appearances (43 starts) and pitched 41 complete games with a 32–11 record and 2.15 ERA, while striking out 160 in  innings.

Season standings 

The team had one game end in a tie; August 18 vs. Detroit Tigers. Tie games are not counted in league standings, but player statistics during tie games are counted.

Record vs. opponents

Opening Day lineup 

Source:

Roster

Player stats

Batting 
Note: Pos = Position; G = Games played; AB = At bats; H = Hits; Avg. = Batting average; HR = Home runs; RBI = Runs batted in

Starters by position

Other batters 
Note: G = Games played; AB = At bats; H = Hits; Avg. = Batting average; HR = Home runs; RBI = Runs batted in

Pitching 
Note: G = Games pitched; IP = Innings pitched; W = Wins; L = Losses; ERA = Earned run average; SO = Strikeouts

Starting pitchers

Other pitchers 
Note: G = Games pitched; IP = Innings pitched; W = Wins; L = Losses; ERA = Earned run average; SO = Strikeouts

Relief pitchers
Note: G = Games pitched; W = Wins; L = Losses; SV = Saves; ERA = Earned run average; SO = Strikeouts

References

External links 
1902 Boston Americans team page at Baseball Reference
1902 Boston Americans season at baseball-almanac.com

Boston Red Sox seasons
Boston Americans
Boston Americans
1900s in Boston